Kanye  is a Yoruba, Igbo, Swahili, Zulu and Xhosa name. In Yoruba culture, the name means "next in line". In Igbo cutlure, the name means "let's give". The name or word Kanye can also be derived from Bantu languages indigenous to the Swahili people of Eastern Africa meaning "only once"; "only one" and "to shine". In Zulu and Xhosa cultures of South Africa, UzuKhanye means "ought to shine".

People
 Kanye West (born 1977), American rapper, singer,  musician, record producer.

Notes 

African masculine given names
Masculine given names
Igbo names
Igbo given names
Yoruba given names

Surnames